Till 16 and older... was a television program of the first program of the Soviet Central Television and the Channel One Russia, dedicated to the problems of young people, which was published in the 1983–2001 years.

References

External links
 Заставка передачи в позднее время
 До 16 и старше... at the tv-80.ru

Channel One Russia original programming
Soviet television shows
1980s Soviet television series
1990s Russian television series
2000s Russian television series
Russian television talk shows
Russian television news shows